"2000 Light Years from Home" is a song by the English rock band the Rolling Stones, released on their 1967 album Their Satanic Majesties Request. Written by Mick Jagger and Keith Richards, it also appeared as the B-side to the American single "She's a Rainbow", and charted as a single in Germany.

Jagger reportedly wrote the lyrics in Brixton prison following his conviction on drug charges in June 1967. The song was recorded by the band at Olympic Studios during July and September 1967. The working title of the instrumental backing was "Toffee Apple". Brian Jones performs prominent accompaniment on Mellotron.

The number was regularly featured during the Stones' 1989–90 Steel Wheels/Urban Jungle Tours

Until 1997, when "She's a Rainbow" was also added to the band's stage repertoire, it was the only track from Satanic Majesties that the band had performed in concert. For the first time in 23 years, The Rolling Stones played "2000 Light Years from Home" on 29 June 2013 at The Glastonbury Festival.

Live version
In 1991, a live version was released as the B-side to "Highwire."

Personnel

According to authors Philippe Margotin and Jean-Michel Guesdon, except where noted:

 Mick Jagger vocals, maracas
 Keith Richards backing vocals, lead guitar, fuzz bass
 Brian Jones Mellotron, electric dulcimer
 Bill Wyman bass, oscillator
 Charlie Watts drums

Additional personnel
 Nicky Hopkins piano
 Unidentified musicians female backing vocals, plucked piano strings, claves

Charts

Notes

References

Sources

 
 

British psychedelic rock songs
The Rolling Stones songs
Decca Records singles
London Records singles
1967 songs
Songs written by Jagger–Richards
1968 singles
Music videos directed by Michael Lindsay-Hogg
Space rock songs
Monster Magnet songs